Komogovina is a village in the Donji Kukuruzari municipality of central Croatia.

It is the location of the Serbian Orthodox Komogovina Monastery.

References

Populated places in Sisak-Moslavina County
Serb communities in Croatia